The 1962 Christchurch mayoral election was part of the New Zealand local elections held that same year. In 1962, election were held for the Mayor of Christchurch plus other local government positions. The polling was conducted using the standard first-past-the-post electoral method.

Background
Sitting mayor George Manning was re-elected for a third term, greatly increasing his majority against deputy mayor Harold Smith. There was a large swing to the Labour Party on the city council as well, with Labour gaining seven of the nineteen council seats.

Mayoralty results
The following table gives the election results:

Councillor results

References

Mayoral elections in Christchurch
1962 elections in New Zealand
Politics of Christchurch
October 1962 events in New Zealand
1960s in Christchurch